Sara Jade McGlashan (born 28 March 1982) is a New Zealand former cricketer who played as a right-handed batter and wicket-keeper. She appeared in 2 Test matches, 134 One Day Internationals and 76 Twenty20 Internationals for New Zealand between 2002 and 2016. She played domestic cricket for Central Districts and Auckland in New Zealand, as well as having stints with Australian Capital Territory, Sydney Sixers, Sussex and Southern Vipers.

McGlashan along with Nicola Browne set the highest record 6th wicket partnership in the Women's World Cup history (139*). In 2016, she hit the final runs that secured the fightback for Sydney Sixers to qualify for the playoffs despite losing six games in a row to start the season. She is the sister of Peter McGlashan.

References

External links

1982 births
Living people
Cricketers from Napier, New Zealand
New Zealand women cricketers
New Zealand women Test cricketers
New Zealand women One Day International cricketers
New Zealand women Twenty20 International cricketers
New Zealand expatriate sportspeople in England
New Zealand expatriate sportspeople in Australia
Central Districts Hinds cricketers
Auckland Hearts cricketers
Sydney Sixers (WBBL) cricketers
Sussex women cricketers
Southern Vipers cricketers
ACT Meteors cricketers
Wicket-keepers